Bradley Tusk (born October 3, 1973) is an American businessman, venture capitalist, political strategist, and writer. He is the founder and CEO of Tusk Ventures, a venture capital fund focused on investing in early-stage startups in regulated industries. His foundation Tusk Philanthropies is working to bring mobile voting to the United States. He is also the chairman of IG Acquisition Corp, a SPAC planning to acquire a business in the leisure, gaming and hospitality industries. Tusk is the host of the podcast Firewall, is a columnist for Fast Company, and is the author of The Fixer: My Adventures Saving Startups from Death by Politics.

He previously served as the campaign manager for New York City Mayor Michael Bloomberg's successful 2009 re-election bid, as Deputy Governor of Illinois, as Communications Director for US Senator Chuck Schumer and as an early political advisor to Uber.

Early life and education
Bradley Tusk was raised in Sheepshead Bay, Brooklyn and in Nassau County, Long Island. Tusk is a graduate of the University of Pennsylvania where he received his BA in 1995. He has a JD from the University of Chicago Law School, which he received in 1999.

Politics and Government

Pennsylvania 
Tusk began his career in politics as an undergraduate student working for the former Mayor of Philadelphia, Ed Rendell.

New York 
After graduating from college, Tusk became the spokesperson for the New York City Parks Department and helped run various divisions of the agency, most notably launching a successful campaign to change the way New Yorkers obey the leash law. Tusk later returned to serve as Senior Advisor to New York City Parks Commissioner Henry Stern,

Tusk then joined U.S. Senator Chuck Schumer as Communications Director from 2000-2002, handling communications, strategy, and policy for the Senator, most notably in the aftermath of the September 11th attacks on New York City.

In 2009, Tusk was named campaign manager for Michael Bloomberg's bid for a third term as Mayor of New York City. While the campaign kept to internal deadlines and made no serious missteps, he believed that the large staff was becoming complacent and staff were reportedly unhappy about him requiring them to work until 8 pm every night.  After Bloomberg's re-election, Tusk joined his administration Michael Bloomberg, as special advisor to the mayor, where he led a successful effort to re-write the New York City Charter to allow Bloomberg to serve a third term.   He also assisted with creating the Mayor's campaign promise index, making Bloomberg the nation's first public official to publicly report the status of each campaign promise.

Tusk returned to New York City politics a decade later as an advisor and strategist for Andrew Yang's campaign in the 2021 New York City mayoral election, playing a unique role as both co-campaign managers were employees of his firm.  After referring to Yang as an "empty vessel" in a March interview, critics warned that “Tusk could essentially be the shadow mayor for New York, while he is representing the interests of big corporate clients.”  Tusk responded to the allegations, declaring “if we win, I will not lobby or talk with the new mayor — nor anyone in a Yang administration — on any matter that intersects with our work” in a statement. After Yang lost by an unexpectedly wide margin, Yang's former advisers criticized Tusk Strategies for avoiding freewheeling press conferences that were a feature of his Presidential campaign.

Illinois
In 2003, Governor Rod Blagojevich appointed Tusk to be Deputy Governor of Illinois. In the position, Tusk failed to file required financial disclosure reports on at least three occasions.  Tusk has said that he thinks Mr. Blagojevich may have hired him believing that because of his relative youth and inexperience he wouldn’t notice the scams Blagojevich's administration was pulling. In 2006, Mr. Tusk resigned; three years later, Blagojevich was impeached and removed from office. Tusk testified as a witness in the criminal trial of Blagojevich, which ended in Blagojevich's conviction, recounting the occasion when Blagojevich asked him to hold up a government grant until a fundraiser was held. Tusk said at trial that he put a stop to the plans and reported the incident to the chief ethics officer. 

Among the accomplishments Tusk cites from his time as deputy governor are efforts to make Illinois the first state to guarantee health care for all children, the first state to offer pre-school to all 3- and 4-year olds, the first state to import prescription drugs from Europe and Canada, and the first state to convert its entire tollway system to Open Road Tolling.

Private sector 
After serving as Deputy Governor of Illinois, Tusk was hired as a senior vice president at Lehman Brothers, where he created the lottery monetization group and headed all of its efforts regarding U.S. based lotteries. Combining his backgrounds in finance and politics, Tusk developed a successful framework to help states monetize their lotteries.

In 2015, Tusk ran a public affairs campaign for Uber that included television, radio, and digital ads as well as direct mail and grassroots organizing in opposition to a cap on rideshare vehicles proposed by New York City Mayor Bill de Blasio.  The campaign argued that "the company was good for the city, providing jobs and transportation for less affluent residents in the outer boroughs." The bill was dropped before it reached a vote.  After the campaign's success in New York City, Tusk moved onto other places like Boston, Philadelphia, Chicago, Miami, Los Angeles, Denver and Washington D.C. For his representation of Uber, Tusk was compensated with equity in the company estimated to be worth $100 million.  The experience also provided him with exposure to the world of venture capital, and Tusk Ventures was launched two weeks after the New York City victory.

Tusk Strategies
In 2011 Tusk founded Tusk Strategies, which is the first firm dedicated to helping startups navigate political issues and is based in New York City.  The firm develops and runs campaigns for companies, including Comcast, Google, Walmart, AT&T, Pepsi, and institutions including Stanford University, the Rockefeller Foundation and Texas A&M, and individuals including Michael Bloomberg and George Lucas.

Tusk Strategies also conducts issue advocacy campaigns around education reform and government; campaigns to help political candidates, non-profits and trade associations.

Tusk Ventures 
In 2015, Tusk launched Tusk Ventures, a venture capital fund that invests in startups facing political and regulatory challenges or pursuing political and governmental opportunities. His work with startups began in 2011, when he worked with transportation startup Uber, which was contesting with regulation proposed by the Taxi and Limousine Commission (CE) of New York City.

Tusk Ventures has worked with over three dozen startups including Bird, FanDuel, Lemonade, Handy, Eaze, Nexar, GlamSquad, Ripple, MainStreet, Nurx, Ro, Kodiak Robotics, pymetrics, Grove and Care/Of, solving a variety of political, regulatory and media challenges solely in return for equity in each company and for investment rights in each company's next round of financing.

Tusk Venture Partners 1 raised its first fund in 2016 and began deploying capital into startups including Lemonade, Nexar, Care/Of, Circle, Coinbase, Bird, Ro and FanDuel.

Ivory Gaming Group
Ivory Gaming Group was co-founded by Bradley Tusk and Christian Goode in 2015 to develop and manage casinos, including their day-to-day operations which include food and beverage services, marketing and media.

Tusk Philanthropies
Tusk created Tusk Philanthropies. In 2017, Tusk Philanthropies launched an initiative to popularize the need for mobile voting to citizens and elected officials across the country. The services Tusk has backed so far are based on blockchain technology, but he has stated that he is open to other technologies. However, David Dill of Verified Voting, and the National Election Defense Coalition have expressed skepticism that any internet-based voting system would be vulnerable to manipulation, either by hackers or by the company owning the system.

Published works
In 2018, Tusk wrote The Fixer: My Adventures Saving Startups from Death by Politics (published by Penguin Group).  According to colleagues, the book "takes more credit than he deserves" for Tusk's political consulting achievements.

See also
 Trump Statue Initiative

References

External links

Living people
American campaign managers
Lehman Brothers people
Fordham University faculty
American political activists
University of Chicago Law School alumni
Employees of the United States Senate
1973 births
People from Sheepshead Bay, Brooklyn
People from Nassau County, New York